Karnataka State Dr. Gangubhai Hangal Music and Performing Arts University, also abbreviated as KSGH Music and Performing Arts University (KSGH MPAU), is a public university exclusively dedicated to the study and research of music and performing arts. It was established by the Government of Karnataka. It is functioning from a heritage building (its temporary campus) in the Lakshmipuram area of Mysore. It is named after Gangubhai Hangal.

It offers undergraduate, postgraduate and doctoral courses.

Founding
The university was founded on 14 February 2008 and formally established by the State Government of Karnataka through the Karnataka State Dr Gangubai Hangal Music and Performing Arts University Act, 2009 which was duly passed in State Legislature.

See also
 Tamil Nadu Music and Fine Arts University
 Bhatkhande Sanskriti Vishwavidyalaya
 Indira Kala Sangeet Vishwavidyalaya
 Raja Mansingh Tomar Music & Arts University
 Manipur University of Culture

References

External links 
 Official Website

Universities in Mysore
Music schools in India
Art schools in India
Dance schools in India